Malew A.F.C. are a football club from Ballasalla, Malew in the Isle of Man. They compete in the Isle of Man Football League. They wear a red and black kit and play their home games at Clagh Vane in Ballasalla.

History

Formed in 1922, R H Kermode, Arthur Craine, T Karran, A.E. Craine and A. Cormode were instrumental in getting the club started. The club was admitted to the Second League and continued to contest the Championship up to the Second World War. 
In 1928, only six years into their history, the club won the Southern Section of the 2nd League before defeating Michael United 4–0 in the decider for the Second League Title. At this stage, relegation and promotion had not been incorporated into Manx Football.

In the 1933/34 season, they missed out on the title after losing to Peel in a decider, but made amends the following season by clinching their 2nd title.

In 1937, Malew made their first appearance in the Junior Cup Final only to be beaten by Rushen United but the following season they won their third Second League title. This was a historic occasion as Malew were the last side to win this trophy before the introduction of relegation & promotion.

In 1974, they won the Hospital Cup, defeating favourites Peel 5–2 in the final. Gordy Lowey scored a hat-trick with brother Alfie scoring the other two.

In the 2014–15 season, Malew's striker Andy Glover won the Isle of Man FA Silver Boot after bagging 42 goals in 18 games and subsequently awarded with the title of Isle of Man Division 2 Player of the Year 2014–15.

In the 2020–21 season, Malew finished the league season by winning six and drawing two of their final eight fixtures, resulting in qualification for the semi finals of the season ending Paul Henry Gold Cup. Despite taking an early lead, a below par performance saw opponents RYCOB run out 5-2 winners and progress to the final.

They did also progress to the quarter finals of the FA Cup after beating Premier League Marown 3–1 in the last 16, before conceding a last minute winner to lose 3–2 away to Ramsey.

The club will celebrate its centenary in the 2021–22 season and will be looking to end their long wait for a trophy.

References

Football clubs in the Isle of Man
Association football clubs established in 1922
1922 establishments in the Isle of Man